Cambridge Center is a development complex located in the Kendall Square section of Cambridge, Massachusetts, along Broadway and Main streets. The project was started in 1979 and continues in progress to this day.

Currently, Cambridge Center is host to the Cambridge Marriott, a Legal Sea Foods restaurant, and many small to medium-sized companies.  It is located in Kendall Square, near the Kendall/MIT station MBTA red line stop.

Some of the buildings have MIT designations and are partially used for academic and research purposes.

Alphabet Inc has its Cambridge office split across three buildings in Cambridge Center.

On September 16, 2011, an initiative by the City of Cambridge was unveiled called the Entrepreneur Walk of Fame.  The walk of fame seeks to highlight individuals that have made contributions to innovation in the global business community.

References

Geography of Cambridge, Massachusetts